The 2019–20 Melbourne Renegades Women's season was the fifth in the team's history. Coached by Tim Coyle and captained by Jess Duffin, the Renegades finished the regular season of WBBL05 in fourth place and qualified for finals. They were subsequently knocked out of the tournament by the defending champions, the Brisbane Heat, in a four-wicket semi-final loss at Allan Border Field.

Squad 
Each 2019–20 squad featured 15 active players, with an allowance of up to five marquee signings including a maximum of three from overseas. Australian marquees are players who held a national women's team contract at the time of signing on for their WBBL|05 team.

On 20 August 2019 incumbent captain Amy Satterthwaite announced she would miss the season via maternity leave. Her vacant marquee spot would be filled by Tammy Beaumont, while Jess Duffin was appointed as the team's new captain. Other off-season personnel changes included the loss of quick bowler Tayla Vlaeminck to the Hobart Hurricanes, and the addition of wicket-keeper Josie Dooley from the Brisbane Heat. Despite being ruled out of playing duties, Satterthwaite would continue to contribute off-field in a specialist coaching capacity throughout the WBBL|05 season. Tim Coyle would again return as the team's head coach.

After scoring a T20I century for Sri Lanka against Australia on 29 September, former Renegades batter Chamari Atapattu stated in a post-match press conference she had not been offered a contract for the upcoming Women's Big Bash League season despite her eagerness to participate, underlining the league's fierce competition for overseas marquee selection. However, it was announced on 30 November that Atapattu had signed with the Renegades for their last regular season game and finals. She replaced Tammy Beaumont who would miss out on the WBBL|05 finals due to national team commitments.

Following a season-ending shoulder injury to Claire Koski in a 1 November defeat at the WACA, the W/BBL Technical Committee approved the addition of local replacement player Anna Lanning. On 19 November, it was announced all-rounder Sophie Molineux had requested to take some time away from cricket to focus on her mental health and wellbeing. Coach Tim Coyle said the club would welcome Molineux back for their finals campaign if she made herself available, but such a return did not eventuate.

The table below lists the Renegades players and their key stats (including runs scored, batting strike rate, wickets taken, economy rate, catches and stumpings) for the season.

Ladder

Fixtures 
All times are local time

Regular season 

Requiring 28 runs off the last 12 deliveries with only three wickets in hand, the Renegades pulled off a "great escape" victory against the Sixers through a last-ball six from Courtney Webb against the bowling of Marizanne Kapp. It marked the first time a WBBL team had won a match when needing more than four runs off the final legal delivery. The ramifications of the result were season-shaping as the Renegades went on to edge out the Sixers for fourth spot on the ladder, making it the first season the Sixers would fail to qualify for finals.

Knockout phase 

In the first-ever semi-final encounter between the two teams, the Renegades batted first and were slow out of the blocks to be down 2/59 in the ninth over. An ensuing 80-run partnership from 58 balls between Josie Dooley and Jess Duffin ended when the latter was stumped by Beth Mooney off the bowling of Jess Jonassen. A quickfire cameo of 22 off 8 by Georgia Wareham finished the innings promisingly while Dooley, having won a championship with the Heat in the previous season, top-scored for the Renegades with 50 not out. The Heat top-order batters of Maddy Green, Jess Jonassen and Grace Harris then "produced fireworks," collectively scoring 126 runs while only facing 79 balls. Molly Strano picked up wickets throughout the second innings, although Brisbane only required 15 runs with 27 balls remaining by the time she claimed her (and the Renegades') fourth. Despite a mini-collapse late in the chase, the Heat hauled in the target of 164 with a comfortable buffer of twelve balls to spare, knocking the Renegades out of the tournament.

Statistics and awards 

 Most runs: Jess Duffin – 544 (3rd in the league)
 Highest score in an innings: Danielle Wyatt – 87 (55) vs Brisbane Heat, 27 November
 Most wickets: Molly Strano – 24 (1st in the league)
 Best bowling figures in an innings: Molly Strano – 4/28 (4 overs) vs Brisbane Heat, 7 December
 Most catches (fielder): Georgia Wareham – 8 (4th in the league)
 Player of the Match awards:
 Jess Duffin, Molly Strano, Danielle Wyatt – 2 each
 Anna Lanning, Sophie Molineux, Courtney Webb – 1 each
 Renegades Player of the Season: Jess Duffin
 WBBL|05 Player of the Tournament: Danielle Wyatt (3rd), Jess Duffin (equal 4th)
 WBBL|05 Team of the Tournament: Jess Duffin (captain), Molly Strano, Danielle Wyatt
 WBBL|05 Young Gun Award: Courtney Webb (nominated)

Notes

References 

2019–20 Women's Big Bash League season by team
Melbourne Renegades (WBBL)